ABU Sport Club Baku  is a women's handball club from Baku in Azerbaijan. ABU SC Baku competes in the Premier Handball League.

Honours 

 Premier Handball League
 Winners (19) : 2001, 2002, 2003, 2004, 2005, 2006, 2007, 2008, 2009, 2010, 2011, 2012, 2013, 2014, 2015, 2016, 2017, 2018, 2019

European record

Team

Current squad 

Squad for the 2016–17 season

Goalkeepers
 Nataliya Gaiovych
 Azaliya Hasanova
 Madina Musayeva
 Sabina Nuriyeva

Wingers
RW
  Sakinat Abbasova
  Yana Nazarova
  Inara Yusibova
LW 
  Yana Gornak
  Aynur Kalmikova
Line Players 
  Vafa Mammadova
  Oksana Orekhova
  Ulviyya Sharifova

Back players
LB
  Irana Gasimova
CB 
  Marta Abbasova
  Anastasiia Metelska 
RB
  Gunel Aliyeva
  Anna Hamidova
  Sakina Musayeva

External links
 
 EHF Club profile

Azerbaijani handball clubs